The Parachute Regiment is an airborne and special forces regiment of the Indian Army. It was raised in 1945 as part of the British Indian Army but was disbanded after World War II and was re-raised in 1952 as part of the Indian Army. Currently it consists of fifteen Special Forces, two Territorial Army and one Rashtriya Rifles battalions.

History

World War II
The first Indian airborne formation was the British Indian Army's 50th Parachute Brigade, which was raised during World War II on 29 October 1941, initially consisting of 151 Parachute Battalion (consisting of British troops), 152 Parachute Battalion (consisting of Indian troops) and 153 Parachute Battalion (consisting of Gurkha troops) alongside other support units.

Lt. (later Col.) A.G. Rangaraj, MVC, of the Indian Medical Service and RMO of 152 Parachute Battalion, became the first Indian along with Hav. Maj. Mathura Singh to make a parachute descent. In 1942–43, the formation saw limited action at Nara against Pathan tribals in the North-West Frontier Province and conducted some intelligence-gathering missions in Burma, utilizing their somewhat limited airborne capabilities. In August 1943, the 154 Parachute Battalion was formed from troops from the 3rd battalion, 7th Gurkha Rifles and assigned to the 50th Parachute Brigade. In March 1944, 151 Parachute Battalion was transferred to Britain, renamed as 156 Parachute Battalion, and assigned to the 4th Parachute Brigade of the 1st Airborne Division. The 50th Parachute Brigade, without 154 Parachute Battalion, then saw extensive action at Sangshak and later in the Imphal plains on the Burmese border against two reinforced Japanese divisions. 154 Parachute Battalion had not completed its air training, so stayed back to attain airborne status.

During the Battle of Sangshak (21–26 March 1944), which lasted six days, the brigade suffered extremely heavy casualties, totalling 40 officers and VCOs and 545 other ranks, winning the appreciation of Lt. Gen. William Slim, the commander of the British Fourteenth Army. The breakout on the night of 26 March 1944 saw the remnants of the once-proud parachute brigade fight its way south and then west through the Japanese-infested jungles to Imphal. It achieved its task of preventing the flanking Japanese forces from surrounding Imphal and destroying IV Corps. Despite the losses it suffered in Sangshak, the paratroopers formed ad hoc units and continued to participate in actions to destroy Japanese forces near and around Imphal until its withdrawal at the end of July.

Later in 1944, the brigade was expanded to form the 44th Indian Airborne Division as the original 9th Airborne Division was to be named because the 44th Armoured Division (whose services were no longer required in the Middle East theatre of war) was to be converted to an airborne unit. The two ad hoc brigades from the Chindit operations, 14th and the 77th, were included to form the division. The original plan was to have a battalion each of British troops, Indian troops and Gurkha troops in both the parachute brigades, with the 14th being converted for the airlanding role, though there is little known about gliderborne training or operations in India. 14th was later to be converted for the airborne role. The Governor General's Bodyguard (GGBG) joined the airborne fraternity and was named the 44th Airborne Division Reconnaissance Squadron. 9 Field Regiment (RIA) and other support units too were inducted. 60th Indian Parachute Field Ambulance which till then had been in Burma and performed well, was selected to augment the medical element for the formation. The 44th Indian Airborne Division was finally designated the 2nd Indian Airborne Division in 1945. The plan was to raise an entire airborne corps with the British 6th Airborne Division (of D-Day/Normandy fame) to be brought to India as the second divisional formation, but the war ended before it could materialize.

The Indian Army's Parachute Regiment was officially formed on 1 March 1945, consisting of four battalions and an equal number of independent companies. The regiment's first airborne action was towards the end of the war, when a reinforced Gurkha Parachute Battalion was parachuted into Burma at Elephant Point on 1 May 1945, as part of Operation Dracula. The battalion performed well earning the respect of all, including the critics of airborne warfare. Despite the performance in Operation Dracula, the Parachute Regiment was disbanded in late 1945 as part of the reduction and restructuring of the post-war British Indian Army. However, they retained their airborne role and formed part of the airborne division.

Indian independence
After independence and partition, the airborne division was divided between the armies of India and newly formed Pakistan, with India retaining the Divisional HQ and the 50th and 77th Parachute Brigades, while the 14th Parachute Brigade went to Pakistan. The 77th Parachute Brigade was later disbanded. Thus, the Indian Army retained only one airborne formation, the 50th Parachute Brigade. This brigade consisted of three distinguished battalions from different regiments: the 1st battalion, Punjab Regiment (Para), the 3rd battalion, Maratha Light Infantry (Para), and the 1st battalion, Kumaon Regiment (Para). These battalions had been carrying out parachute duties after the disbandment of the regiment in 1945, and had continued to wear the uniform of their parent regiments except for a change in headgear to the maroon beret, and in order to distinguish them from the other battalions of their regiments, the word 'Para' was added after their names.

Indo-Pakistani War of 1947

Both the 50th and 77th Parachute Brigades saw extensive action in the Indo-Pakistani War of 1947. The three parachute battalions and the support units of the 50th Parachute Brigade saw extensive action. The three battalions distinguished themselves in the battles of Shelatang, Naushera, Jhangar and Poonch, after which they were awarded the respective battle honours. The brigade commander, Brig. Mohammad Usman, was killed in action on 3 July 1948, and was posthumously awarded the Maha Vir Chakra.

60 Parachute Field Ambulance, as part of the 77th Parachute Brigade, also saw action in Kashmir where it raised and maintained the now famous Cariappa Hospital catering to the needs of numerous units in its vicinity (27 Indian Army and State Forces battalions along with other units) and constantly faced shortages due to the war situation and inclement weather conditions. The unit's performance, like other units of the parachute brigade, was beyond all expectations and resulted in the awarding of numerous gallantry awards, including a Vir Chakra to Capt. V. Rangaswami, the surgeon.

60 Parachute Field Ambulance and the Korean War

With the North Korean invasion of South Korea in 1950, the UN sent out a call to the free world for assistance. India decided not to get involved militarily but contributed a medical unit, the 60 Parachute Field Ambulance (60 PFA) which served in Korea for a total of four years. 60 PFA was involved in providing medical cover to the forces of the UN Command as well as the ROK Army and local civilians, and earned the title, "The Angels in Brown Berets" due to their iconic reddish-brown berets. The unit also looked after the North Korean POWs. They treated over 222,000 soldiers and civilians from 1950 to 1954.

The highlight of the tenure undoubtedly was when the unit provided their services during Operation Tomahawk on 21 March 1951 to the US Army's 187 Airborne Regimental Combat Team for which the unit was awarded two Maha Vir Chakras, one bar to Vir Chakra and six Vir Chakras, and a host of other Indian and international individual and unit decorations. These included the unit citations from the US and South Korean Army chiefs, commendations from the 1st Commonwealth Division, and British commanders. There was a special mention of the unit in the House of Lords in the British Parliament. The 12 members of the unit who participated in the airborne operation were also awarded the American Parachutist Badge. On their return to India, the unit was awarded the President's Trophy by the first President of the Republic of India, Dr. Rajendra Prasad on 10 March 1955 at Agra, the first one of its kind and the only one to date. The troops of the unit were also awarded 25 Mentioned-in-Despatches.

Re-raising
On 15 April 1952, the Parachute Regiment was re-raised by absorbing the three existing parachute battalions of the 50th Parachute Brigade. The 1st battalion, Punjab Regiment (Para) was redesignated as the 1st battalion, Parachute Regiment (Punjab). The 3rd battalion, Maratha Light Infantry (Para) was redesignated as the 2nd battalion, Parachute Regiment (Maratha). The 1st battalion, Kumaon Regiment (Para) was redesignated as the 3rd battalion, Parachute Regiment (Kumaon). The Parachute Regiment Depot and Records was raised at Agra on 15 April 1952, to coincide with the raising of the regiment. All personnel documents for troops who were serving in the three parachute battalions that were converted into the Parachute Regiment were transferred to Depot and Records from the Punjab Regiment, Maratha Light Infantry and the Kumaon Regiment. Simultaneously, a Personal Accounts Office (PAO) for the regiment was raised at Mathura as part of PAO (OR) Artillery. Until 1952, the 50th Parachute Brigade had used the Pegasus with "India" written under it, as a formation sign. When the Parachute Regiment was raised, a new formation sign, a light blue Shatrujeet, a half-horse half-man with wings and a bow and arrow in a ready position, signifying the operational readiness of the brigade, on a maroon background, replaced the Pegasus. The new cap badge and the formation sign was designed by Capt (later Lt Get) ML Tuli, of 3 Para (Kumaon).

1961 saw the raising of the 4th battalion to augment the strength of the regiment. After the Sino-Indian War of 1962, the regiment, as with the rest of the armed forces, saw expansion on an unprecedented scale, with the 5th battalion raised in 1962, the 6th battalion raised in 1963 and the 7th battalion raised in 1964, followed by raising of the 8th battalion. A second parachute brigade, the 51st, was also raised to complement the 50th Brigade but was reverted to normal infantry role in 1976.

Of the original units of the 50th Parachute Brigade, only two exist as of date, namely 411 Parachute Field Company of the Bombay Sappers, the oldest parachute unit of the Indian Army and the 50th Parachute Brigade Signal Company. The original medical unit, 80 Parachute Field Ambulance, became part of 14 Parachute Brigade went over to Pakistan while 43 Para Fd AMb was disbanded as with the other minor units of the 77th Para Bde, and only one field ambulance, 60 Parachute Field Ambulance (now 60 Parachute Field Hospital) was retained in the airborne role. The other minor units followed suit. The Governor General's Bodyguard was retained in the pathfinder role.

Para (Special Forces)

During the Indo-Pakistani War of 1965, an irregular force with volunteers from various infantry regiments under Maj. Megh Singh Rathore of the Brigade of the Guards carried out unconventional operations and achieved results disproportionate to its strength, and the need for unconventional forces was felt. The force had been disbanded and the volunteers reverted to their parent units. Major Megh Singh Rathore was tasked to raise a battalion for the purpose, resulting in the raising of 9th battalion, Parachute Regiment (Commando) on 1 July 1966. The unit was originally raised as part of the Brigade of the Guards, but due to the parachute qualification being an essential part of commando operations, the battalion was transferred to the Parachute Regiment and became the 9th battalion, Parachute Regiment (Commando). One year later, on 1 July 1967, the battalion was split into two and both battalions were brought up to strength as the 9th battalion, Parachute Regiment (Commando) and the 10th battalion, Parachute Regiment (Commando). In 1979, the 1st battalion, Parachute Regiment, was put through trial conversion into a Special Forces battalion modeled on the lines of the British SAS and after a three-year conversion period re-designated as a Special Forces battalion, named as 1st battalion, Parachute Regiment (Commando). The two Parachute Commando battalions (9 and 10) were also subsequently re-designated as Special Forces battalions. At some point, the name "Commando" was replaced by "Para (Special Forces)". On 1 February 1996, the 21st battalion, Maratha Light Infantry, was officially transferred to the Parachute Regiment and was re-designated as the 21st battalion, Parachute Regiment (Special Forces), though the conversion had been underway since 1994. In 1999, the 2nd battalion, Parachute Regiment was also converted into a Special Forces battalion, followed in 2002 by the 3rd battalion and in 2003 by the 4th battalion. Subsequently, in the year 2010, the 11th battalion, Parachute Regiment (Special Forces) and in the year 2013 the 12th battalion, Parachute Regiment (Special Forces) raised at Agra to augment the strength of the existing Special Forces battalions. In the year 2022 In a significant boost to operational capability, airborne battalions 5th,6th,7th,23rd & 29th battalions were converted to a specialist role having honed their skills over two gruelling months that culminated in a validation over seven days. Another battalion 13th battalion, Parachute Regiment (Special Forces) was raised in Bangalore in 2022.

Indo-Pakistani War of 1965

During the Indo-Pakistan War of 1965, 1 Para of the Parachute Regiment, placed under operational command of 68 Infantry Brigade, played an important role in the capture of the strategic Hajipir Pass, located on the western fringe of Pir Panjal ranges on the Pakistani side and dominating the Rajouri -Poonch-Uri highway in India. The battalion under command of Major Ranjit Singh Dayal (Later awarded MVC for the operation) was responsible for the capture of Sank, Ser and Ledwali Gali on 26 and 27 August and the Hajipir Pass on 28 August 1965. Thereafter, repeated attempts by the enemy to recapture the Pass were thwarted by paratroopers of the battalion. In recognition of its resilient gallantry and indomitable spirit, 1 Para earned the Battle Honour ‘Hajipir’ and Theatre Honour ‘Jammu & Kashmir’ in 1965. At the same time in the Lahore sector, the 50 Parachute Brigade was tasked with capturing of the Jallo railway bridge. Despite being a newly raised battalion 6 Para of the Parachute Regiment with superb battle drill and fighting spirit attacked the Jallo railway bridge enduring stiff resistance and heavy artillery fire. The unit successfully captured and occupied the bridge on September 17 raising the success signal ‘Ghora’.The officers and men in the brigade were overjoyed with this operationally critical capture.

Indo-Pakistani War of 1971

During the Indo-Pakistani War of 1971, the regiment saw numerous actions in both the eastern and western theatres. For the first time in independent India's history, an airborne infantry battalion (2nd battalion, Parachute Regiment) was dropped at Tangail, which contributed substantially to speeding up the liberation of Bangladesh. Elements of the 2nd battalion became the first Indian troops to enter Dhaka. The regiment's Commando battalion proved their professional skills by conducting spectacular lightning raids into Chachro, Sindh, Pakistan and Mandhol, Jammu and Kashmir. The regiment earned the battle honours Poongli Bridge, Chachro, Mandhol and Defence of Poonch during these operations. While the 51st Parachute Brigade saw action in Sri Ganganagar, Rajasthan, the 50th Parachute Brigade saw action initially in Bangladesh with 2 Para in the airborne role, 7 Para as the advance guard and the rest of the brigade in a ground role. The 50th Parachute Brigade then moved to assist its sister brigade in the western sector, thus becoming the only formation to see action on both fronts.

Operation Pawan

Five Parachute Regiment battalions (including the three Commando battalions) took part in Operation Pawan, as part of the Indian Peace Keeping Force in Sri Lanka.

Operation Cactus

With 6 Para as its spearhead and 7 Para as reserve, the 50th Parachute Brigade under Brig. Farukh Bulsara took part in Operation Cactus in November 1988, the first successful overseas intervention operation since Korea to rescue the president and aid the duly elected government of the Maldives.

Counter insurgency operations
Parachute Regiment battalions have been employed in counter-insurgency roles, both in the northeast and Jammu and Kashmir, earning fifteen COAS Unit Citations.

The Ashok Chakra, India's highest gallantry award in peacetime, was awarded posthumously to:-
 
Capt. Arun Singh Jasrotia (9 Para (SF), 1996)
Maj. Sudhir Kumar Walia (9 Para (SF), 2000)
Ptr. Sanjog Chhetri (9 Para (SF), 2003)
Capt. Harshan R (2 Para (SF))
Hav. Bahadur Singh Bohra (10 Para (SF), 2008) 
Hav. Gajender Singh Bisht (10 Para (SF),SAG, 2009)
Maj. Mohit Sharma (1 Para (SF), 2010)
L.Nk. Mohan Nath Goswami (9 Para (SF),2016)

9 Para (Special Forces) was conferred the "Bravest of the Brave" honour in 2001.

Kargil War

In 1999, seven out of the ten parachute regiment battalions were deployed in Kargil district, Jammu and Kashmir, as part of Operation Vijay, which bears testimony to the operational profile of the regiment. 6 Para and 7 Para, along with 1 Para (SF) cleared the Mushkoh Valley intrusions, while 5 Para was actively involved in Batalik sector, where it exhibited great courage and tenacity, and was awarded the COAS unit citation. 10 Para (SF) was involved in operations at Khalubar Ridge. 9 Para (SF) saw combat at the heights of Zulu Ridge by passing through land mines and clearing them. It was one of toughest operations in the Kargil war.

United Nations operations
Calls of international peacekeeping have taken airborne units to Korea (1950–54), the Gaza Strip (1956–58), Sierra Leone (2000, as part of UNAMSIL), Congo, Sudan and Ethiopia/Eritrea. The operations in Sierra Leone involved a daring rescue mission conducted by the 2 Para (SF) and 9 Para (SF). Parachute Regiment battalions also have officers/PBOR serving in staff roles or as observers with various United Nations missions.

Recent times

Recently, two more infantry battalions underwent probation and were re raised as Parachute Regiment battalions by transfer from other regiments. In 2014, the 23rd battalion, Rajputana Rifles was transferred to the Parachute Regiment and redesignated as the 23rd battalion, Parachute Regiment. Simultaneously, the 29th battalion, Rajput Regiment was transferred to the Parachute Regiment and redesignated as the 29th battalion, Parachute Regiment.

Mountaineering and South Pole Expedition
The Parachute Regiment has historically been active in the field of mountaineering. The late Capt. (later Col.) Avtar Singh Cheema of 7 Para was the first Indian atop Mount Everest in 1965. Capt. Abhijeet Singh from 7 Para also summited the peak while Brig. Saurabh Singh Shekhawat of 21 Para (SF) scaled the peak thrice in 2001, 2003 and 2005, and has also scaled peaks in the French Alps and in Africa. Col Sarfraz Singh of 6 Para led a seven-member team of Nimas to the world's highest peak on 20 May 2018.

A Parachute Regiment team scaled Nanda Devi in 1981 when they attempted both main and east peaks simultaneously. The southwest face of Nanda Devi East was climbed for the first time, but both climbers, Premjit Lal and Phu Dorjee, were killed in the descent. Three others – Daya Chand, Ram Singh, and Lakha Singh – also fell to their deaths, leading to the highest ever number of casualties on the mountain.

Maj. Jai Bahuguna, a famous climber of the Corps of Engineers who died on Everest, also served with the 50th Parachute Brigade. Maj. (later Maj. Gen.) Mohammed Amin Naik and Capt. (later Col.) Anand Swaroop, also of the Corps of Engineers, summitted Nanda Devi in 1993. Maj. N. Linyu of 60 Parachute Field Hospital is the first female airborne officer who has participated in numerous expeditions in the Himalayas. She summited Everest in May 2012, and is also an accomplished skydiver.

Col. J.K. Bajaj, an EME officer serving with the 50th Parachute Brigade, who commanded 2 (Independent) Parachute Field Workshop, became the first Asian to ski to the South Pole with the Overland International Expedition to plant the Indian flag at the South Pole on 17 January 1989. Col. Balwant Sandhu and Col. J.K. Bajaj have commanded the Nehru Institute of Mountaineering in Uttarkashi.

Training
On 1 May 1952, a training wing of the Parachute Regiment was formed at Kota under the Brigade of the Guards Training Centre and thus started the direct recruitment and training of recruits for the Parachute Regiment. The regiment started augmenting its strength from 1961. About the same time, in order to ensure a better intake of recruits into the regiment, the raising of a training centre was authorized on 13 March 1963, and the Indian government accorded sanction for raising of an independent training centre. The executive order for raising the Parachute Regiment Training Centre was received on 22 June 1963. The Parachute Regiment Depot and Records was redesignated as the Parachute Regiment Training Centre, then located at Agra Fort. The first batch of recruits from the Rajputana Rifles, Rajput Regiment, Sikh Regiment and Dogra Regiment started arriving in the training battalions located at Kheria Camp On 26 September 1963, the Parachute Regiment training wing at Kota joined the centre. On 5 February 1965, the centre moved to Morar Cantonment, Gwalior. The centre, in addition to conducting training of Parachute Regiment recruits, was also responsible for all parachute training. For this purpose, a Parachute Holding Wing was established on 1 April 1966. The Para Holding Wing was responsible for carrying out basic and reservist training for all active and reservist paratroopers. In wartime, the Para Holding Wing had the added responsibility of providing transit camp facilities for the launching of an airborne operation. On 5 June 1967, the Personal Accounts Office (Other Ranks) of the Parachute Regiment also moved from Mathura to Gwalior. On 2 October 1975, the Parachute Regiment Training Centre, Records and PAO (OR) moved to Agra. On 15 January 1977, the erstwhile Para Holding Wing was disbanded and additional staff and vehicles were authorised to the Parachute Regiment Training Centre to carry out all of the above functions of the Para Holding Wing. The Para Holding Wing continued functioning from Kheria and its old name was retained. The Para Holding Wing thereafter merged with the Army Airborne Training School, Agra on 15 January 1992. On 15 January 1992, the Parachute Regiment Training Centre along with the Records and PAO (OR) moved to Bengaluru and occupied the erstwhile location of the Pioneer Corps and Training Centre.

Insignia

The regimental badge for the Parachute Regiment is an open parachute, partially behind a circle with the word "Parachute" at the top and a scroll at the bottom with the word "Regiment"; wings are spread out from the circle, and a dagger is superimposed on the parachute and upper portion of the circle; the whole in silver metal. As with much of the world's parachute forces, the normal headgear is a maroon beret, although there is a maroon turban for Sikh personnel.

The special forces, which form part of the Parachute Regiment, have a distinct insignia called Balidaan, which has a commando dagger point downwards, with upward-extending wings extending from the blade and a scroll superimposed on the blade with "Balidaan" inscribed in Devanagari; the whole in silver metal on an upright red plastic rectangle. The special forces personnel also wear a maroon curved shoulder title with "Special Forces" embroidered in light blue, succeeding the "Commando" tab in 2006 which was in use since inception.

There remains a single airborne brevet: an open parachute in white, with light blue wings extended from it, the whole on a grey-green drab background. Some other variants have existed for ceremonial/mess uniforms, e.g. with gold wired wings on a maroon flannel, the same on a scarlet background for the President's Bodyguard on their ceremonial tunics. This was formerly worn on the upper right sleeve but since 1975 appears above the right chest pocket and name tab. There is also a small enamelled version (white parachute with blue, yellow, or red wings) worn on the left pocket as Jump Indicator Wings (for 25, 50 or 100 descents, respectively). The small enamelled badge has now been replaced by a brass badge called Para Indicator Badge with stars at the bottom of the parachute, with one star denoting 25 jumps, two stars 50 and three stars 100.

Units

The regiment has a total of fifteen regular, one Rashtriya Rifles and two Territorial Army battalions. Of the regular battalions, five were airborne infantry battalions, but now have been re-designated as Para (SF) on Modification Airborne, while ten are special forces (Para (SF)) battalions. Formerly designated "Commando" units, they are now designated "Special Forces".
1st Battalion (Special Forces)
2nd Battalion (Special Forces)
3rd Battalion (Special Forces)
4th Battalion (Special Forces)
5th Battalion (Special Forces)
6th Battalion (Special Forces)
7th Battalion (Special Forces)
9th Battalion  (Special Forces)
10th Battalion (Special Forces)
11th Battalion (Special Forces)
12th Battalion (Special Forces)
13th Battalion (Special Forces)
21st Battalion (Special Forces)
23rd Battalion (Special Forces)
29th Battalion (Special Forces)
31st Battalion (Rashtriya Rifles)
106th Infantry Battalion (Territorial Army) (based at Bengaluru, Karnataka)
116th Infantry Battalion (Territorial Army) (based at Devlali, Maharashtra)

Former units:

8th Battalion was transferred and redesignated as the 16th Battalion Mahar Regiment. In 1976 before reconverting into the 12th Battalion, Mechanised Infantry Regiment.

When the 8th Battalion was converted, a sizeable part of the battalion was retained in the airborne role for some time, forming the armoured element of the 50th Parachute Brigade, equipped with BMP-2 infantry fighting vehicles. However, due to administrative and logistic reasons, that unit was discontinued and their role was taken over by the airborne battalions themselves, with a platoon strength of each battalion being trained and equipped for the mechanized role within the brigade.

However, 8 Para was converted in 1976 to 16 Mahar & later to 12 Mech. Inf.

Four of the special forces battalions were originally trained for use in certain environments: the 1st battalion was the strategic reserve, the 9th battalion were trained for mountains, the 10th battalion was trained for deserts and the 21st battalion was trained for jungles. However, currently all special forces battalions are cross trained for all environments.

Honorary Officers
Mahendra Singh Dhoni was commissioned into the 106th Infantry Battalion Territorial Army with the rank of Hon. Lt. Col by the President of India on 1 November 2011
Deepak Rao was commissioned into the 116th Infantry Battalion Territorial Army with the rank of Hon. Major by the President of India on 1 November 2011. He is cited to be India's foremost pioneer and specialist in close quarter warfare by the Indian Ministry of Defence. His method of reflex shooting has been used to modernize close quarter combat shooting in Northern Command and Eastern Command under directive of Army commanders.

Decorations

Post-1947 
 Theatre Honours 
 2 PARA (MARATHA) - Jammu & Kashmir 1947-1948
 3 PARA (KUMAON) - Jammu & Kashmir 1947-1948
 1 PARA - Jammu & Kashmir 1965 
 2 PARA - East Pakistan (Bangladesh) 1971
 9 PARA CDO - Jammu & Kashmir 1971
 10 PARA CDO - Sindh 1971
 5 PARA - Kargil 1999
 9 PARA SF - Kargil 1999
 10 PARA SF - Kargil 1999

Battle Honours 
 3 PARA (KUMAON) - Shelatang, Jammu & Kashmir 1947
 2 PARA (MARATHA) - Jhangar, Jammu & Kashmir 1947
 1 PARA - Hajipir, Jammu & Kashmir 1965
 6 PARA - Jallo, Lahore 1965
 2 PARA - Poongli Bridge, East Pakistan 1971
 4 PARA - Sand Dune, Ganganagar 1971
 10 PARA CDO - Chachro, Sindh 1971
 9 PARA CDO - Mandhol, Jammu & Kashmir 1971
 6 PARA - Maldives 1988 
 5 PARA - Batalik, Kargil 1999

 COAS Unit Citation 
 1992 - 21 PARA CDO 
 1995 - 9 PARA CDO
 1996 - 5 PARA
 1997 - 3 PARA
 1998 - 1 PARA SF, 2 PARA 
 2000 - 5 PARA , 6 PARA
 2001 - 9 PARA SF , 31 RR
 2003 - 3 PARA , 9 PARA SF
 2004 - 2 PARA SF, 31 RR
 2005 - 5 PARA , 10 PARA SF
 2006 - 1 PARA SF , 21 PARA SF 
 2007 - 3 PARA SF 
 2009 - 2 PARA SF , 10 PARA SF 
 2011 - 1 PARA SF , 21 PARA SF 
 2012 - 4 PARA SF 
 2017 - 9 PARA SF , 4 PARA SF 
 2019 - 1 PARA SF , 9 PARA SF 
 2020 - 23 PARA
 2021 - 10 PARA SF 
 2023 - 4 PARA SF

Numerous soldiers of the regiment have been awarded honours for bravery in operations. These include:
Ashoka Chakra - 8
Maha Vir Chakra - 11
Kirti Chakra - 13
Param Vishisht Seva Medal - 07
Uttam Yudh Seva Medal - 06
Ati Vishisht Seva Medal - 13
Vir Chakra - 61
Shaurya Chakra - 53
Yudh Seva Medal - 10
Vishisht Seva Medal - 28
Sena Medal - 246
Bar to SM-05
MiD-265

Ashoka Chakra
Capt. Arun Singh Jasrotia - 9 PARA SF (1996)
Maj. Sudhir Kumar Walia - 9 PARA SF (2000)
Ptr. Sanjog Chhetri - 9 PARA SF (2003)
Capt. Harshan R - 2 PARA SF (2007)
Hav. Gajender Singh Bisht - 10 PARA SF (2009) on NSG deputation
Hav. Bahadur Singh Bohra - 10 PARA SF (2009)
Maj. Mohit Sharma - 1 PARA SF (2009) 
L/Nk Mohan Nath Goswami - 9 PARA SF (2016)

Maha Vir Chakra
Brig. Mohd Usman - 50(I) PARA BDE (1948)
Lt Col. HK Virk - 2 PARA (1948)
Maj. AK Ramaswamy - 2 PARA (1948)
Maj. SMS Brar - 3 PARA (1948)
Ptr. Man Singh - 3 PARA (1948)
Maj. SP Chopra - 2 PARA (1948)
Lt Col. Dharam Singh - 3 PARA (1948)
Maj. RS Dayal - 1 PARA (1965)
Lt Col. S Bhawani Singh - 10 PARA CDO (1971)
Maj. VK Berry - 4 PARA (1971)

Kirti Chakra
Ptr. Jagpal Singh - PARA (1985)
Sub. Mahavir Singh Yadav - 1 PARA CDO (1985)
Naik. Bansode YM - 2 PARA (1991)
Maj. Ivan Joseph Crastro - 1 PARA CDO (1993)
Lt Col. Sunil Kumar Razdan - 7 PARA (1996)
Hav. Badri Lal Lunawat - 10 PARA SF (1999)
Capt. R Subramanian - 1 PARA SF (2001)
N/Sub. Ishwar Singh - 5 PARA (2002)
Capt. Sajjan Singh Malik - 10 PARA SF (2005)
Maj. Manish Hiraji Pitambre - 3 PARA SF (2007)
Maj. Shubash Chand Punia - 21 PARA SF (2008)
Ptr. Shabir Ahmed Malik - 1 PARA SF (2009)
Sub. Indra Bahadur Pun - 4 PARA SF (2009)
Capt. Zala Ajitkumar Arshibhai - 2 PARA SF (2009)
Lt Col. Saurab Singh Shekhawat - 21 PARA SF (2009)
Capt. Davinder Singh Jass - 1 PARA SF (2010)
Lt. Vikas Sharma - 6 PARA (2011)
Lt Col. Nectar Sanjenbam - 21 PARA SF (2015)
Capt. Jaidev Dangi - 10 PARA SF (2015)
Sub. Mahendra Singh - 9 PARA SF (2016)
Maj. Rohit Suri - 4 PARA SF (2017)
Sub. Sanjeev Kumar - 4 PARA SF (2021)

Bar to Sena Medal (Gallantry)
Capt. Sudhir Kumar Walia - 9 PARA CDO (1994)
Maj. Deepak Singh Bisht - 1 PARA SF (2002)
Col. Anup Singh Dhar - 5 PARA (2004)
Maj. Anil Gorshi - 6 PARA (2005)
Maj. Pranay Padmakar Panwar - 4 PARA SF (2011)
Capt. Umesh Lamba - 1 PARA SF (2018)
Hav. Rajesh Kumar - 1 PARA SF (2018)
Lt Col. Bheemaiah PS - 10 PARA SF (2019)
N/Sub. Anil Kumar - 9 PARA SF (2020)

See also
50th Parachute Brigade (India)
 Para (Special Forces)

References

External links
All about the Parachute Regiment
Official website of the Parachute Regiment
Paras on Bharat-Rakshak

P
Parachuting in India
India
India
P
Military units and formations of India in World War II
Military units and formations established in 1945
Military units and formations in Burma in World War II
United Nations contingents in Korea